The 1940 Nobel Prize in Literature was not awarded when the Nobel committee's deliberations were upset by the start of World War II in September 1, 1939. Instead, the prize money was allocated with 1/3 to the Main Fund and with 2/3 to the Special Fund of this prize section. This was the fourth occasion in Nobel history that the prize was not conferred.

Nominations
Despite no author(s) being awarded for the 1940 prize due to the ongoing second world war, numerous literary critics, societies and academics continued sending nominations to the Nobel Committee of the Swedish Academy, hoping that their nominated candidate may be considered for the prize. In total, the academy received 26 nominations for 19 individuals.

Seven of the nominees were nominated first-time such as Carl Sandburg, Gabriela Mistral (awarded in 1945), Lin Yutang, Bert Bailey, and Edmund Blunden. The highest number of the nominations – three nominations – was for the French writer Henriette Charasson. Three of the nominees were women, namely Gabriela Mistral, Henriette Charasson, and Maria Madalena de Martel Patrício.

The authors Isaak Babel, Walter Benjamin, E. F. Benson, Marie Bregendahl, John Buchan, Mikhail Bulgakov, Mikhail Bulgakov, Tomás Carrasquilla, Charley Chase, Lucio D'Ambra, William Henry Davies, Mary Bathurst Deane, Charles Edgar du Perron, F. Scott Fitzgerald, Hamlin Garland, Emma Goldman, Anton Hansen (known as A. H. Tammsaare), Thomas Little Heath, Nicolae Iorga, Ze'ev Jabotinsky, Panuganti Lakshminarasimha Rao, Jan Lorentowicz, Edwin Markham, Hendrik Marsman, Ricardo Miró, Eileen Power, Ameen Rihani, T. O'Conor Sloane, Santōka Taneda, Menno ter Braak, Leon Trotsky, Nathanael West, and Humbert Wolfe died in 1940 without having been nominated for the prize.

References

1940
Cultural history of World War II